In 1804, there were two special elections for the U.S. Senate from New York:

 February 1804 United States Senate special elections in New York
 November 1804 United States Senate special election in New York